MTV Unplugged is an Indian music television program showcasing musical artists, generally playing their works on acoustic instruments. The songs featured on the program are usually those released earlier by the artists.

Season 1 
This season had ten episodes, which officially aired on 1 October 2011. All the artists featured their own songs, which were released earlier.

Episode 1 (1 October 2011) 
Rabbi Shergill
 Bullah Ki Jaana
 Bilqis
 Heer
 Challa
 Ganga
 Tere Bin
 Jugni

Episode 2 (8 October 2011) 
Mohit Chauhan
 Masakali
 Mai Ni Meriye
 Ganga Nahaley
 Guncha Koi
 Dooba Dooba
 Babaji
 Tumse Hi

Episode 3 (15 October 2011) 
Indian Ocean
 Bandeh
 Kandisa
 Ma Rewa
 Melancholic Ecstasy
 Nam Myo Ho
 Shunya

Episode 4 (22 October 2011) 
Rekha Bhardwaj
 Tere Ishq Mein
 Genda Phool
 Tere Bin Nahi Lagda
 Madaniya
 Ab Mujhe Koi
 Ranjha Ranjha

Episode 5 (29 October 2011) 
Susheela Raman
 Raise Up
 Yeh Mera Deewanapan
 Muthu Kumar
 Ennapane
 Sakhi Maaro (feat. Kutle Khan)
 Paal
 Magdalene

Episode 6 (5 November 2011) 
Shilpa Rao
 Nain Parindey
 Javeda Zindagi (feat. Keerthi Sagathia)
 Mudi Mudi
 Dhol Yaara Dhol
 I Feel Good

Episode 7 (12 November 2011) 
Advaita
 Silent Sea
 Hamsadhwani
 Gorakh
 Miliha
 Just Enough
 Durga
 Gates Of Dawn

Episode 8 (19 November 2011) 
Euphoria
 Tum
 Ab Na Jaa
 Mehfuz
 Maaeri
 C U Later
 Dhoom Pichuck
 Item

Episode 9 (26 November 2011) 
Javed Ali
 Aaja O Meri Tamanna
 Maula Maula
 Ek Din Teri Raahon Mein
 Pukarta Chala Hoon Main
 Hai Guzarish
 Barsan Lagi

Episode 10 (3 December 2011) 
Ranjit Barot
 Vande Mataram (feat. Kutle Khan)
 Shloka
 Sabah Pathiki
 Zindagi
 Maula Mere (feat. Roop Kumar Rathod)
 Night Song

Season 2 
The show officially aired on 3 November 2012. Its promos were released about one & half months ago on YouTube and the MTV official website.

Episode 1 (3 November 2012) 
A.R. Rahman
 Ye Jo Des Hai Tera
 Rehna Tu
 Phir Se Udd Chala (feat. Arun H.K.)
 Tu Bole (feat. Neeti Mohan)
 Nenjukulle (feat. Shakthisree Gopalan)
 Aaj Jaane Ki Zid Na Karo
 Dil Se Re

Episode 2 (10 November 2012) 
Shafqat Amanat Ali
 Aankhon Ke Saagar
 Yeh Hausla
 Aavo Saiyon
 Manmaniyan
 Mora Saiyaan
 Kyun Main Jaagoon

Episode 3 (17 November 2012) 
Sunidhi Chauhan
 Udi
 Mar Jaaiyaan
 Yaariyaan
 Kyun
 Tu
 Neeyat

Episode 4 (24 November 2012) 
Indus Creed
 Trapped
 Cry
 Fireflies
 Take It Harder
 Bulletproof
 Pretty Child

Episode 5 (1 December 2012) 
Kailasa
 Teri Deewani
 Daaro Na Rang
 Albeliya
 Tu Jaane Na
 Katha Gaan
 Saiyaan

Episode 6 (8 December 2012) 
Ash King
 Te Amo
 I Love You
 Dil Gira Dafatan
 Love Is Blind
 Auntyji
 Kaise

Episode 7 (15 December 2012) 
Lucky Ali
 Tu Kaun Hai
 Sunoh
 O Sanam
 Tere Mere Saath
 Saiyaah
 Maut

Episode 8 (22 December 2012) 
Agnee
 Aahatein
 Kaarwaan
 Saadho Re
 Ranjhan Yaar Di
 Thumri
 Dukki Tikki

Episode 9 (29 December 2012) 
Multi-Artists
 Pani Da Rang – Ayushmann Khurrana
 Pareshaan – Shalmali Kholgade
 Raabta – Arijit Singh
 Yahi Meri Zindagi – Aditi Singh Sharma
 Jiya Re – Neeti Mohan
 Ishq Sufiyaana – Kamal Khan

Season 3
This season aired from 23 November 2013.

Episode 1 (23 November 2013) 
Sonu Nigam
 Abhi Mujh Mein Kahin
 Cham Cham
 Satrangi Re
 Tanhayee
 Crazy Dil
 Kal Ho Na Ho

Episode 2 (30 November 2013) 
Farhan Akhtar
 Tum Ho Toh
 Pichhle Saat Dino Mein
 Senorita
 Rock On
 Main Aisa Kyun Hoon
 Dil Chahta Hai

Episode 3 (7 December 2013) 
Mika Singh
 Subah Hone Na De
 Singh Is King
 Saajna
 Agal Bagal
 Pungi
 Sawan Mein Lag Gayi Aag

Episode 4 (14 December 2013) 
Arijit Singh
 Duaa
 Phir Mohabbat
 Ilahi
 Phir Le Aya Dil 
 Kabira
 Tum Hi Ho

Episode 5 (21 December 2013) 
Benny Dayal
 Tarkeebein
 Medley
 Ek Main Hu Aur Ek Tu
 Badtameez Dil
 Daaru Desi
 Kaise Mujhe Tu
 Omana Penne

Episode 6 (28 December 2013) 
Pentagram
 Nocturne
 Voice
 Tomorrow's Decided
 Must I
 Ignorant One
 Human Failings
 Drive

Episode 7 (4 January 2014) 
The Raghu Dixit Project
 Lokada Kalaji
 Yaadon Ki Kyaari
 Jag Changa
 Hey Bhagwan
 Gud Gudiya
 Mysore Se Aayi

Episode 8 (11 January 2014) 
K.K.
 Yaaron
 Pal
 Don 2
 O Meri Jaan
 Beetein Lamhein
 Tadap Tadap

Episode 9 (18 January 2014)

MTV Unplugged Season 3's bests

Season 4
The fourth season aired from 22 November 2014.

Episode 1 (22 November 2014) 
Amit Trivedi
 Pardesi
 Zinda
 Nayan Tarse
 Badra Bahar
 Manjha
 Haan Reham
 Ek Lau
 Iktara (feat. Kavita Seth)

Episode 2 (29 November 2014) 
Salim–Sulaiman
 Ali Maula
 Ishq Wala Love
 Aashayein
 Kurbaan Hua
 Shukran Allah
 Ainvayi Ainvayi (feat. Sunidhi Chauhan)
 Tumko Nahi Chhodungi (feat. Sunidhi Chauhan)

Episode 3 (6 December 2014) 
Papon
 Baarish ki Boondein
 Ranjish hi sahi
 Yeh Mojeza
 Boitha Maro
 Kaun Mera
 Kyun
 Jiyein Kyun

Episode 4 (13 December 2014) 
Mithoon
 Tum Hi Ho (instrumental)
 Baarish (feat. Mohammad Irfan Ali)
 Banjaara (feat. Mohammad Irfan Ali)
 Ankhein Teri
 Humdard (feat. Palak Muchhal)

Episode 5 (20 December 2014) 
 Mikey McCleary
 Khoya Khoya Chaand (feat. Shalmali Kholgade)
 Kabhi Kabhi Mere Dil Mein (feat. Shalmali Kholgade)
 Dhak Dhak (feat. Rachel Varghese)
 Tum Itna Jo Muskura rahe ho(feat. Rachel Varghese)
 Little Things
 The World is our Playground
 Dama Dum Mast Kalandar ( feat. Sonu Kakkar)

Episode 6 (27 December 2014) 
Ankit Tiwari
 Dil Darbadar
 Sun Raha Hai Na Tu
 Galliyan
 Sheeshe Ka Samundar
 Tu Mera dil Tu Meri Jaan
 Kuch Toh hua hai

Episode 7 (3 January 2015) 
Sachin–Jigar
 Saibo (feat. Tochi Raina and Priya Panchal)
 Shake your Bootiyas (feat. Divya Kumar)
 Bezubaan (feat. Priya Saraiya)
 Gulabi (feat. Shruti Pathak)
 Babaji Ki Booti

Season 5
The fifth season started from 2 January 2016.

Episode 1 (2 January 2016) 
Hariharan
 Tu Hi Re
 Roja Janeman
 Kaash Aisa
 Jhonka Hawa Ka Aaj Bhi
 Dheemi Dheemi
 Sakhi Re Kahe

Episode 2 (9 January 2016) 
Jeet Gannguli
 Muskurane Ki Wajah (feat. Jake Charkey on Cello)
 Khamoshiyan (feat. Bhaven Dhanak and Jake Charkey on Cello)
 Milne Hai Mujhse Aayi (feat. Jubin Nautiyal)
 Suno Na Sangemarmar
 Hamari Adhuri Kahani
 Chaahun Main Ya Naa (feat. Chinmayi Sripada and Jake Charkey on Cello)

Episode 3 (16 January 2016) 
Sukhwinder Singh
 Ramta Jogi
 Jai Ho
 Bismil
 Chaiyya Chaiyya
 Aatish Para
 Kawa Kawa

Episode 4 (23 January 2016) 
Multi-Artists
 Moh Moh Ke Dhaage – Papon
 Humnava – Papon
 Pehli Baar – Siddharth Mahadevan
 Mitti Di Khushboo – Ayushmann Khurrana
 Yahin Hoon Main – Ayushmann Khurrana
 Hasi – Ami Mishra

Episode 5 (30 January 2016) 
Swarathma
 Topiwalleh
 Ee Bhoomi
 Naane Daari
 Yeshu Allah Aur Krishna
 Sur Mera
 Pyaar Ke Rang
 Pyaasi

Episode 6 (6 February 2016) 
Rahat Fateh Ali Khan
 "Samjhawan Ki"
 "Main Jahaan Rahoon"
 "Tumhe Dillagi"
 "Ankhiya Udeeka Diya"
 "O Re Piya"
 "Saanso Ki Mala"
 "Mann Kunto Maula"
 "Mast Kalandar"
 "Charka Nau Laga"
 "Halka Halka"

Episode 7 (13 February 2016) 
Pritam
 Barfi
 Aaj Din Chadheya (feat. Harshdeep Kaur, Irshad Kamil and Jake Charkey on Cello)
 Tu Jo Mila (feat. Javed Ali)
 Kamli (feat. Shilpa Rao and Javed Ali)
 Afghan Jalebi (feat. Nakash Aziz)

Season 6
The sixth season started from 14 January 2017.

Episode 1 (14 January 2017) 
A. R. Rahman
 Ranjha Ranjha (feat. Shruti Haasan)
 Mann Chandra
 Enna Sona
 Tu Hai (feat. Sanah Moidutty)
 Urvasi Urvasi (feat. Ranjit Barot and Suresh Peters)
 Aise Na Dekho (feat. Rianjali)

Episode 2 (21 January 2017) 
Shreya Ghoshal
 Sunn Raha Hai (Sufi Version)
 Mohe Rang Do Laal
 Rasm-e-Ulfat
 Leja Leja Re
 Agar Tum Mil Jao
 Deewani Mastani

Episode 3 (28 January 2017) 
Neeti Mohan and Benny Dayal
 Tune Maari Entriyaan
 Sau Aasmaan
 Sapna Jahan
 Dhadaam Dhadaam
 Locha-E-Ulfat
 Bang Bang

Episode 4 (4 February 2017) 
Sachin–Jigar
 Mileya Mileya
 Chunar
 Jeena Jeena
 Sun Sathiya (feat. Priya Saraiya)
 Saibo
 Beat Pe Booty
 G-Phad Ke

Episode 5 (11 February 2017) 
The Fusion of Stars- Divya Kumar, Amit Mishra, Jasleen Royal, Siddharth Mahadevan, Shahid Mallya, Jubin Nautiyal
 Jee Karda- Divya Kumar
 Bulleya- Amit Mishra
 Preet- Jasleen Royal
 Nachde Ne Saare- Jasleen Royal and Siddharth Mahadevan
 Ikk Kudi- Shahid Mallya
 Ae Dil Hai Mushkil- Jubin Nautiyal

Episode 5.1 (18 February 2017) 
The Best Of MTV Unplugged Season 6

Episode 6 (25 February 2017) 
Amit Trivedi
 Pashmina
 Aahatein (feat. Karthik)
 Gubbare
 Da Da Dasse (feat. Kanika Kapoor)
 Ud-Daa Punjab
 Shubharambh (feat. Divya Kumar and Yashita Sharma)
 London Thumakada (feat. Divya Kumar)
 Love You Zindagi (feat. Jonita Gandhi)

Season 7 
The seventh season started on 9 December 2017

Episode 1 (9 December 2017) 
Vishal Bhardwaj
 Paani Paani re
 Pehli baar mohabbat
 Dil toh baccha hai ji
 Chhod aaye hum
 Dil ka Mizaaj Ishqiya (feat Rekha Bhardwaj)
 Naina (feat Rashid Khan and Saaskia on Cello)
 Hamari Atariya (feat Rekha Bhardwaj and Rashid Khan)

Episode 2 (16 December 2017) 
Shankar Mahadevan & Sons
 Aave Re Hitchki
 Sapnon Se Bhare Naina
 Bhaag Milkha Bhaag (Siddharth Mahadevan)
 Babu Samjho Ishare & Slow Motion Angreza
 Senorita (feat Vivienne Pocha)
 Mast Magan & Tere Naina (Shivam Mahadevan)

Episode 3 (23 December 2017) 
Armaan and Amaal Malik
 Buddhu Sa Mann
 Tere Mere
 Bol Do Na Zara (feat. Jake Charkey on Cello and Jonathan Paul on Piano)
 Sab Tera
 Roke Na Ruke Naina
 Kaun Tujhe
 Main Hoon Hero Tera (feat. Jake Charkey on Cello and Jonathan Paul on Piano)
 Main Rahoon Ya Na Rahoon

Episode 4 (30 December 2017) 
Best Of MTV Unplugged 2017
 Tere Mere (Armaan and Amaal Malik)
 Humri Atariya (Vishal Bhardwaj feat Rekha Bhardwaj and Rashid Khan)
 Aave Re Hitchki (Shankar Mahadevan)
 Naina (Vishal Bhardwaj feat Rashid Khan and Saaskia on Cello)
 Babu Samjho Ishare & Slow Motion Angreza (Shankar Mahadevan & Sons)
 Buddhu Sa Mann (Armaan and Amaal Malik)

Episode 5 (6 January 2018) 
Multi Artist

 Khalbali – (Nakash Aziz)
 Kahaani – (Sunny MR and Shashwat Singh)
 Agar Tum – (Shalmali Kholgade and Shashwat Singh)
 Beech Beech Mein – (Shalmali Kholgade)
 Humsafar Medley – (Madhaniya Akhil Sachedeve)
 Rab Da Banda – (Ahen)

Episode 6 (13 January 2018) 
Monali Thakur
Khwab Dekhe
Sawar Loon 
Anjana Anjani
Khol De Baheein
Salona Sa Sajan 
Moh Moh Ke

Episode 7 (20 January 2018) 
Farhan Akhtar

Yaari (MTV Unplugged) Farhan Akhtar, Rochak Kohli

Maston Ka Jhund (MTV Unplugged) Farhan Akhtar

Episode 8 (27 January 2018) 
Papon

 Tum Itna Jo
 Koi Paas Aaya
 Aaj Jaane Ki Zid Na Karo
 Meri Tanhaiyoon
 Mohabbat Karne Wale
 Bulleya

Episode 9  
Multi Artist

 Hawayein – Tushar
 Home Parinda – Nikhita Gandhi & Jaggi
 Naina – Dhvani Bhanushali
 Yeh Fitoor Mera – Amit Mishra And Tushar
 Galti Se Mistake – Amit Misra

Season 8

Episode 1 (26 January 2019) 
Guru Randhawa

 Ban Ja Tu Meri Rani
 Lahore
 Patola
 Yaar Mod Do
 Sajan Rus Jave Tan

Episode 2 (2 February 2019) 
Sonu Nigam (Ghazal Special)

 Apni Tasveer
 Aye Zindagi
 Khuli Jo Aankh
 Koi Yeh Kaise
 Awargi

Episode 3 (9 February 2019) 
Neha Kakkar, Tony Kakkar, Sonu Kakkar

 Mile Ho
 Oh Humsa
 Waada
 Sun Charkhe Di
 Yeh Kasoor
 Coca Cola Tu
 Story Of Kakkars

Episode 4 (16 February 2019) 

Multi artist 
 Lamberghini (Dhvani Bhanushali)
 Chori Chori (Neeti Mohan)
 Yaara Seeli Seeli (Neeti Mohan)
 O Meri Laila (Amit Mishra)
 Guncha Koi (Bhuvan Bam)
 Gilehriyaan (Jonita Gandhi)
 Daryaa (Shahid Mallya)
 Aaya Na Tu (Arjun Kanungo)

Episode 5 (23 February 2019) 
Best of MTV Unplugged Season 8

Episode 6 (2 March 2019) 
Rekha Bhardwaj

 Mileya Mileya
 Main Tenu Phir Milangi
 Maahi Ve
 Judaai
 Dil Hoom Hoom Kare
 Darling

Episode 7 (9 March 2019) 
Diljit Dosanjh

 Kaali Teri Gutt
 Jind Mahi
 Offline
 Ray Ban
 Jimmy Choo

Episode 8 (16 March 2019) 
Sachin–Jigar

 Nazar
 Kho Diya
 Kamariya
 Hoor
 Haareya
 Afeemi

References

External links 
 MTV Unplugged
 https://www.voot.com/shows/mtv-unplugged-s07/7/553424

2011 Indian television series debuts
Indian music television series
MTV (Indian TV channel) original programming
MTV Unplugged albums
Indian television series based on American television series
Rock music television series
Pop music television series